Amin Husain is a Palestinian-American activist and adjunct professor. He is the lead organizer of Decolonize This Place and the MTL+ co-founder whose organization is founded on five main issues: Free Palestine, Indigenous Struggle, Black Liberation, Global Wage Workers, and de-gentrification. He is part of the part-time faculty at New York University and focuses on resistance and liberation and postcolonial theory in his teaching. He is a founding member of Global Ultra Luxury Faction; founding member and managing editor of the magazine Tidal: Occupy Theory, Occupy Strategy; founding member of the collective MTL; and founding member of NYC Solidarity with Palestine.  He has directed and produced an experimental documentary film about Palestinian Territories titled, On This Land.  He is a supporter of New York City Students for Justice in Palestine and is an active supporter of the Boycott, Sanctions and Divestment (BDS) movement, emphasizing the cultural and academic boycott of Israel.

He has called BDS the tool to blur the distinction “between violence and nonviolence.” In 2012, at an Occupy Wall Street demonstration on “Al-Quds Day” he stated that he grew up in Palestine and was a member of Fatah and part of the resistance movement to Israel. He said, “Then I came over here, searching for an American Dream that has never existed…I’m fighting for Palestine by fighting here.” In 2019, he led the weekly protest at the Whitney Museum in New York called the “Nine Weeks of Art and Action” to protest Warren B. Kanders’ position as the vice-chair of Whitney's board. At the end of the protest on May 17, 2019, the protestors walked to Kanders home.

His advocacy of violence has been criticized by outlets such as The New York Post, which described him of being the "mastermind behind subway attacks," in reference to the J31 action organized by Decolonize this Place as part of a series of demonstrations advocating for "free transit, all cops off the subways, an end to the harassment of vendors, performers, and unhoused people, and full accessibility for those with varying abilities."

He has a B.A. in Philosophy and Political Science from Valparaiso University, a J.D. from Indiana University School of Law and an LL.M. from Columbia Law School.

References 

Indigenous rights activists
Palestinian activists
Fatah members
Living people
Valparaiso University alumni
Indiana University alumni
Columbia Law School alumni
New York University faculty
Anti-Zionism in the United States
Year of birth missing (living people)